The 2013 Asian Shotgun Championships were held in Almaty, Kazakhstan between October 1 and October 10, 2013 at the Asanov Shooting Club.

Medal summary

Men

Women

Medal table

References 

 ISSF Results Overview
 Complete Results

External links 
 Asian Shooting Federation

Asian Shooting Championships
Asian
Shooting
Sports competitions in Almaty
2013 in Kazakhstani sport